Nodar Akhalkatsi (2 January 1938 – 24 January 1998) was a professional football manager from Georgia.

Coaching career
Akhalkatsi coached Soviet club Dinamo Tbilisi to the USSR league championship in 1978, with a side that contained the likes of David Kipiani, Ramaz Shengelia, Vitaly Daraselia, Tengiz Sulakvelidze and Aleksandr Chivadze, all of whom were regular Soviet internationals. The team were renowned for their swashbuckling style of football and attack-minded approach.

The following year, Dinamo entered the European Cup and stunned the reigning champions Liverpool with an impressive 3–0 win in the first round. However, they were eliminated by West German side Hamburg in their next tie.

Two years later, Akhalkatsi enjoyed his finest moment as a manager when he guided Dinamo to victory in the 1981 Cup Winners' Cup final, beating East German outfit Carl Zeiss Jena in Düsseldorf's Rheinstadion. Dinamo had won the 1979 Soviet Cup to gain admittance to the competition, beating FC Dynamo Moscow on penalties in the final.

Akhalkatsi was a member of USSR manager Konstantin Beskov's coaching staff at the 1982 World Cup in Spain, forming a three-man technical team with Beskov and Dynamo Kiev's coach Valeriy Lobanovskyi.

After retirement
In the early 1990s, Akhalkatsi was one of the integral figures in the formation of the Georgian Football Federation after the republic achieved independence from the USSR. He was the organisation's president from 1990 to 1998.

He died of a heart attack on his way to Tbilisi Airport, from where he intended to fly to Moscow to participate in the CIS Cup, on 24 January 1998, aged 60. In 2008, for his contributions to association football, Akhalkatsi became the recipient (posthumously) of the FIFA Order of Merit, the highest honour awarded by FIFA.

His son, Nodar Akhalkatsi junior, was the president of the Georgian Football Federation from June 2005 to September 2009.

Honours

Manager
Dinamo Tbilisi
Soviet Top League
Winner (1): 1978
Runner-up (1): 1977
Soviet Cup
Winner (2): 1976, 1979
Runner-up (1): 1980
UEFA Cup Winners' Cup
Winner (1): 1980–81

Managerial statistics
Source

References

1938 births
1998 deaths
Footballers from Georgia (country)
Soviet footballers
Soviet football managers
Football managers from Georgia (country)
FC Dinamo Tbilisi managers
Footballers from Tbilisi
FC Lokomotivi Tbilisi players
Association football forwards